Rombiolo is a town and comune of the province of Vibo Valentia in the Calabria region of southern Italy.

Geography
Rombiolo borders the following municipalities: Filandari, Limbadi, San Calogero, Spilinga, Zungri.

References

Cities and towns in Calabria